El Tortuguero is a municipality in the South Caribbean Coast Autonomous Region of Nicaragua.

It is located at about 530 km from Managua and can only be reached by an hour-long truck ride from El Rama.

References

Municipalities of the South Caribbean Coast Autonomous Region